The Manhattan Community Board 7 is a New York City community board encompassing the neighborhoods of Manhattan Valley, Upper West Side, and Lincoln Square in the borough of Manhattan.

It is delimited by  Central Park West on the east, northern portion of Columbus Circle, West 60th Street, Columbus Avenue (Ninth Avenue), and West 59th Street on the south, the Hudson River on the west and Cathedral Parkway (West 110th Street) on the north.

Beverly Donohue serves as Chairperson and Max Vandervliet is the District Manager.

Demographics
As of 2010, the Community Board has a population of 209,084; down from 210,993 in 1990. Of them (as of 2010), 140,850 (67.4%) are White non Hispanic, 31,347 (15%) of Hispanic origin, 15,834 (7.6%) are African American, 15,988 (7.6%) Asian or Pacific Islander, 221 (0.1%) American Indian or Native Alaskan, 671 (0.3%) of some other race, 4,173 (2%) of two or more race.
 
As of 2012, 12.2% of the population benefits from public assistance.

References

External links
Official site of the Community Board

Community boards of Manhattan